William Aloysius Brady (June 19, 1863 – January 6, 1950) was an American theater actor, producer, and sports promoter.

Biography
Brady was born to a newspaperman in 1863. His father kidnapped him from San Francisco and brought him to New York City, where his father worked as a writer while William was forced to sell newspapers on street corners. Upon his father's death when William was 15, he hitchhiked his way back to San Francisco.

He made his start onstage in San Francisco with a company headed by Joseph R. Grismer and Phoebe Davies shortly after his return. As a callboy in The White Slave by Bartley Campbell, he filled in a role for an ill actor, and started his career.

After a failed attempt to produce a version of She by H. Rider Haggard, he was able to secure the rights to After Dark, successfully bringing the play to New York. While Brady was sued for his efforts, as Augustin Daly claimed plagiarism, Brady was able to make enough money to continue with his theater ventures.
He inadvertently became a boxing promoter during this time. He cast James J. Jeffries in After Dark, and later introduced the man into the boxing circuit, where Jeffries would eventually become the undisputed heavyweight champion. Brady would be the only person to manage two undisputed heavyweight champions, in Jeffries and James J. Corbett.

Brady produced The Corbett-Fitzsimmons Fight in 1897.  Although Corbett ultimately lost, the match ran for over an hour and a half, and the documentary lasted that long, the longest film ever released at the time. In 1898, Brady and Grismer produced the hugely successful Charlotte Blair Parker play, Way Down East. The two remained partners until Grismer's retirement sometime around 1909.

Other clients
In late 1896 Brady watched as young bicycle racer Major Taylor won his first professional races, a half-mile exhibition and a six-day race at Madison Square Garden. Brady arranged to promote Taylor, who was a Black athlete facing serious obstacles in a racist time. Brady was known for using his tenacity and innovation to secure races for Taylor. For example, when southern cycling officials sought to ban Taylor from national competition, Brady built his own racetrack and started his own cycle race series for Taylor.

Another Brady client was Black polar explorer Matthew Henson. Henson, denied the credit given to white Commander Peary, was financially destitute and physically unable to work, when Brady arranged a national lecture tour for him. In a 1930 interview, a grateful Henson credited Brady for "taking care of" objections by Commander Peary; he said that Brady accepted no promoter's fee for the tour beyond "twenty-five dollars for cigar money."

Theater
Brady ran a successful theatre operation for thirty years, having met actresses like Grace George (whom he later married) and having, at one point, hired famous humorist Robert Benchley to complete ad copy for him. Brady's success continued until the Stock Market Crash of 1929, which wiped out his entire savings. He was able to secure the funds to produce Street Scene, which was written by Elmer Rice, won the Pulitzer Prize, and netted Brady roughly a half a million dollars. His total theatrical output included over 260 plays, including a version of Uncle Tom's Cabin that was later used as images for a book in 1904, and a number of movies before his death.

Slaves All by Edward Percy

Personal life
His first wife was Rose Marie Rene (died 1896). Their daughter was actress Mary Rose Brady, who used stage name of Alice Brady.

His second wife was the well known Broadway actress Grace George. They were married from 1899 until his death in 1950. They had a son, William A. Brady, Jr. (1900–1935) who married the actress Katherine Alexander.

Death

William A. Brady died at age 86 of a heart ailment. He is interred at Sleepy Hollow Cemetery in Sleepy Hollow, New York.

Legacy
He was inducted into the International Boxing Hall of Fame in 1998.

Selected filmography
The Rack (1915)
 Alias Jimmy Valentine (1915)
 What Happened to Jones (1915)
 The Ballet Girl (1916)
 A Woman's Way (1916)
 Bought and Paid For (1916)
 The Scarlet Oath (1916)
 The Men She Married (1916)
 The Beloved Adventuress (1917)
 The Crimson Dove (1917)
 A Woman Alone (1917)
 The Red Woman (1917)
 A Square Deal (1917)
 The Marriage Market (1917)
 The Social Leper (1917)
 Souls Adrift (1917)
Darkest Russia (1917)
 The Woman Beneath (1917)
 Moral Courage (1917)
 The Tenth Case (1917)
 The False Friend (1917)
 The Little Duchess (1917)
 Maternity (1917)
 The Burglar (1917)
The Divorce Game (1917)
 The Strong Way (1917)
The Family Honor (1917)
 Easy Money (1917)
 The Stolen Paradise (1917)
 The Iron Ring (1917)
The Volunteer (1917)
Adventures of Carol (1917)
 The Bondage of Fear (1917)
 Youth (1917)
Man's Woman (1917)
 The Dancer's Peril (1917)
 The Good for Nothing (1917)
 Diamonds and Pearls (1917)
 The Dormant Power (1917)
 Yankee Pluck (1917)
The Page Mystery (1917)
 As Man Made Her (1917)
 The Brand of Satan (1917)
 The Awakening (1917)
 A Maid of Belgium (1917)
 Shall We Forgive Her? (1917)
 The Heart of a Girl (1918)
 The Golden Wall (1918)

References

Further reading
Billy Altman, Laughter's Gentle Soul: The Life of Robert Benchley. (New York City: W. W. Norton, 1997. ).
William A. Brady, Showman: My Life Story.  New York: E. P. Dutton, 1937.
Uncle Tom's Cabin; or, Life Among the Lowly. Embellished with Scenes and Illustrations. New York: R. F. Fenno & Company, 1904.

External links

 
 Showman Manuscript at Dartmouth College Library

1863 births
1950 deaths
American male stage actors
American theatre managers and producers
Boxing managers
Burials at Sleepy Hollow Cemetery